Alfonso, Duke of Calabria may refer to:

Alfonso II of Naples (1448–1495), formerly Duke of Calbria
Infante Alfonso, Duke of Calabria (1901–1964)